Kuyavian-Pomeranian Voivodeship, also known as Cuiavian-Pomeranian Voivodeship or simply Kujawsko-Pomorskie, or Kujawy-Pomerania Province is one of the 16 voivodeships (provinces) into which Poland is divided. It was created on 1 January 1999 and is situated in mid-northern Poland, on the boundary between the two historic regions from which it takes its name: Kuyavia and Pomerania. Its two chief cities, serving as the province's joint capitals, are Bydgoszcz and Toruń.

History
The Kuyavian-Pomeranian Voivodeship was created on 1 January 1999, as a result of the Polish local government reforms adopted in 1998. It consisted of territory from the former Bydgoszcz, Toruń and Włocławek Voivodeships.

The area now known as Kuyavia-Pomerania was previously divided between the region of Kuyavia and the Polish fiefdom of Royal Prussia. Of the two principal cities of today's Kuyavian-Pomeranian voivodeship, one (Bydgoszcz) was historically located in Pomerania, whilst the other (Toruń) was an important town of Royal Prussia.

Administration and territory

The functions of regional capital are split between Bydgoszcz and Toruń. Bydgoszcz serves as the seat of the centrally appointed governor or voivode, while Toruń is the seat of the elected Regional Assembly (sejmik), and of the executive elected by that assembly, headed by the voivodeship marshal (marszałek województwa).

The Kuyavian-Pomeranian Voivodeship is bordered by five other voivodeships. These are Pomeranian Voivodeship to the north, Warmian-Masurian Voivodeship to the north-east, Masovian Voivodeship to the east, Łódź Voivodeship across a short boundary to the south, and Greater Poland Voivodeship to the south and west.

Cities and towns 

The voivodeship contains 5 cities and 47 towns. These are listed below in descending order of population (according to official figures for 2019):

Economy 
The Gross domestic product (GDP) of the province was 21.8 billion euros in 2018, accounting for 4.4% of Polish economic output. GDP per capita adjusted for purchasing power was 17,300 euros or 57% of the EU27 average in the same year. The GDP per employee was 64% of the EU average.

Transportation

Transportation infrastructure is of critical importance to the voivodeship's economy. Kuyavia-Pomerania is a major node in the Polish transportation system. Railway lines from the South and East pass through Bydgoszcz to connect to the major ports on the Baltic Sea. In addition to this, Bydgoszcz is home to the rolling stock manufacturer PESA SA, Poland's largest and most modern producer of railway and tram products. The province's sole international airport, Ignacy Jan Paderewski Airport, is located in Bydgoszcz and has connections to a number of European destinations as well as Warsaw, which are all operated by either Irish carrier Ryanair or LOT Polish Airlines.

The main railway stations of the province are Bydgoszcz main station and Toruń main station; both stations are served by fast PKP Intercity trains which connect them with the capital Warsaw, as well as other major Polish cities. In addition to these fast express services, inter-regional trains are operated by the firm Przewozy Regionalne, whilst domestic rail transportation within the voivodeship is provided by Arriva RP, a private firm to which the provincial government subcontracted the provision of rail transport.

All major towns of the province have municipal transportation companies operating buses, whilst Bydgoszcz, Toruń and Grudziądz also have extensive tram systems.

Politics

The Kuyavian-Pomeranian voivodeship's government is headed by the province's voivode (governor) who is appointed by the Polish Prime Minister. The voivode is then assisted in performing his duties by the voivodeship's marshal, who is the appointed speaker for the voivodeship's executive and is elected by the sejmik (provincial assembly). The current voivode of Kuyavia-Pomerania is Ewa Monika Mes, and the present marshal is Piotr Całbecki.

The Sejmik of Kuyavia-Pomerania consists of 33 members.

Governors

Administrative division 
The Kuyavian-Pomeranian Voivodeship is divided into 23 counties (powiats): 4 city counties and 19 land counties. These are further divided into 144 gminas.

The counties are listed in the following table (ordering within categories is by decreasing population).

Protected areas

Protected areas in Kuyavian-Pomeranian Voivodeship include the nine Landscape Parks listed below.
Brodnica Landscape Park (partly in Warmian-Masurian Voivodeship)
Chełmno Landscape Park
Gopło Landscape Park
Górzno-Lidzbark Landscape Park (partly in Masovian and Warmian-Masurian Voivodeships)
Gostynin-Włocławek Landscape Park (partly in Masovian Voivodeship)
Krajna Landscape Park
Tuchola Landscape Park (partly in Pomeranian Voivodeship)
Vistula Landscape Park
Wda Landscape Park

Gallery

See also
 Pomeranian Voivodeship
 West Pomeranian Voivodeship
 Kuyavian-Pomeranian (European Parliament constituency)
 Pomeranian-Kuyavian Derby

Notes

External links
 Visit Kuiavia-Pomerania
Government of Kuyavian-Pomeranian Voivodeship
 The Official Tourism Website of Kuyavian-Pomeranian Voivodeship
 Blog about Tourismus in Kuyavian-Pomeranian Voivodship

 
1999 establishments in Poland
States and territories established in 1999